Miss South Africa 2014, the 59th edition of the Miss South Africa pageant, was held on 30 March 2014 at Sun City Superbowl.

The pageant was broadcast on DStv on Mzansi Magic, and was hosted by television and radio personality Elana Afrika-Bredenkamp. The final was contested by 12 girls who were selected after weeks of grueling challenges at Sun City International.

The pageant was won by Rolene Strauss who, in the December of the same year, was also crowned Miss World. Strauss' winning of the Miss World title made her ineligible for Miss Universe; this led to Miss South Africa 2014 first runner up Ziphozakhe Zokufa being crowned Miss South Africa, to allow Zokufa  to compete for the Miss Universe 2014 crown.

Results 
Color keys

Contestants

Special prizes

Judges

Music and entertainment 
 Bucie
 Mi Casa
 Matthew Mole

Crossovers 
Contestants who previously competed or will be competing at international beauty pageants: 

Miss World
2014:  Mpumalanga – Rolene Strauss (Winner)
 (London)

Miss Universe
2014:  Eastern Cape – Ziphozakhe Zokufa (Unplaced)
 (Miami)

Miss Global Beauty Queen
2011:  Gauteng – Caylene Marais (4th Runner-Up)
 (Seoul)

References

External links
Official website

2014
2014 beauty pageants
2014 in South Africa
March 2014 events in South Africa